The Southeastern Indochina dry evergreen forests are a tropical dry broadleaf forest ecoregion of Indochina.

Setting

The Southeastern Indochina dry evergreen forests occupy the lower portion of the Mekong Basin, where they are intertwined with the Central Indochina dry forests. The Southern Annamites montane rain forests border the dry evergreen forests on the east, occupying the higher elevations of the Annamite Range. To the south, the Indochina mangroves lie between tropical seasonal forests and the South China Sea. The Tonle Sap-Mekong peat swamp forests and Tonle Sap freshwater swamp forests lie to the southeast, in the seasonally and permanently flooded lowlands along the Tonle Sap and lower Mekong rivers and Tonle Sap Lake.

Flora
The Southeastern Indochina dry evergreen forests are one of three dry broadleaf forest ecoregions with predominantly evergreen trees; trees in dry broadleaf forests typically lose their leaves during the dry season.

Fauna
The ecoregion is home to many large mammals, including the Asian elephant (Elephas maximus), tiger (Panthera tigris), previously one of two known populations of the now extinct Javan rhinoceros (Rhinoceros sondaicus annamiticus), Eld's Deer (Cervus eldi), banteng (Bos javanicus), gaur (Bos gaurus), clouded leopard (Pardofelis nebulosa), leopard (Panthera pardus), Malayan sun bear (Ursus malayanus), and khting-vor (Pseudonovibos spiralis).

Conservation
A 2017 assessment found that 28,210 km², or 23%, of the ecoregion is in protected areas. Another 23% is forested but outside protected areas.

References

External links
 
 

Ecoregions of Cambodia
Ecoregions of Laos
Ecoregions of Thailand
Ecoregions of Vietnam
Indomalayan ecoregions
Tropical and subtropical dry broadleaf forests